Stefan Trienekens (born 21 August 1970) is a German former professional footballer who played as a forward.

References

1970 births
Living people
German footballers
Association football forwards
KFC Uerdingen 05 players
FC Remscheid players
Fortuna Düsseldorf players
FC Wegberg-Beeck players
MSV Duisburg II players
Bundesliga players
2. Bundesliga players